Events in the year 1966 in Mexico.

Incumbents 
 President — Gustavo Díaz Ordaz (1911-1979), president 1964-1970

Cabinet
 Interior Secretary: Luis Echeverría Álvarez 
 Foreign Affairs Secretary: Antonio Carrillo Flores  
 Defense Secretary: General Marcelino García Barragan  
 Navy Secretary: Antonio Vázquez del Mercado 
 Treasury Secretary: Antonio Ortiz Mena  
 Secretary of Communications and Transportation: José Antonio Padilla Segura
 Education Secretary: Agustín Yáñez  
 Attorney General of Mexico: Antonio Rocha Cordero
 Regent of the Federal District Department: Ernesto P. Uruchurtu

Supreme Court
 President: Agapito Pozo Balbás

Governors

 Aguascalientes: Enrique Olivares Santana
 Baja California: Raúl Sánchez Díaz Martell
 Campeche: José Ortiz Avila
 Chiapas: José Castillo Tielemans
 Chihuahua: Práxedes Ginér Durán
 Coahuila: Braulio Fernández Aguirre
 Colima: Francisco Velasco Curiel
 Durango: Enrique Dupré Ceniceros/Ángel Rodríguez Solórzano 
 Guanajuato: Juan José Torres Landa
 Guerrero: Raymundo Abarca Alarcón
 Hidalgo: Carlos Ramírez Guerrero
 Jalisco: Francisco Medina Ascencio
 State of Mexico: Juan Fernández Albarrán
 Michoacán: Agustín Arriaga
 Morelos: Emilio Riva Palacio 
 Nayarit: Julián Gazcón Mercado
 Nuevo León: Eduardo Elizondo
 Oaxaca: Rodolfo Brena Torres
 Puebla: Antonio Nava Castillo/Aarón Merino Fernández
 Querétaro: Manuel González Cosío 
 San Luis Potosí: Manuel López Dávila
 Sinaloa: Leopoldo Sánchez Celis
 Sonora: Luis Encinas Johnson  
 Tabasco: Manuel R. Mora Martínez
 Tamaulipas: Praxedis Balboa 	
 Tlaxcala: Anselmo Cervantes
 Veracruz: Fernando López Arias
 Yucatán: Luis Torres Mesías
 Zacatecas: José Rodríguez Elías
 South Territory of Baja California: Rufo Figueroa Figueroa
 Federal Territory of Quintana Roo: Hugo Cervantes del Río

Events

Awards
Belisario Domínguez Medal of Honor – 
National Prize for Arts and Sciences in History, Social Sciences, and Philosophy:

Movies

Sports

Music

Notable births
 January 4 – La Parka II, luchador (d. 2020)
 May 9 – José Aarón Alvarado Nieves, professional wrestler (d. 1999)
 May 22 – Francisco Blake Mora, politician (d. 2011)
 July 16 – Arkangel de la Muerte, professional wrestler (d. 2018)
 July 20 – Enrique Peña Nieto, President of Mexico 2012-2018
 August 17 – Daniela Castro, actress and singer
 October 13 – José Ángel Llamas, actor
 October 15 – Jorge Campos, Mexican footballer and coach

Notable deaths
 January 17: Manuel González Serrano, painter (b. 1917)

References

External links

 
Years of the 20th century in Mexico
Mexico